Bismuth oxynitrate is the name applied to a number of compounds that contain Bi3+, nitrate ions and oxide ions and which can be considered as compounds formed from Bi2O3, N2O5 and H2O. Other names for bismuth oxynitrate include bismuth subnitrate and bismuthyl nitrate. In older texts bismuth oxynitrate is often simply described as BiONO3 or basic bismuth nitrate. Bismuth oxynitrate was once called magisterium bismuti or bismutum subnitricum, and was used as a white pigment, in beauty care, and as a gentle disinfectant for internal and external use. It is also used to form Dragendorff's reagent, which is used as a TLC stain.

Bismuth oxynitrate is commercially available as Bi5O(OH)9(NO3)4 or as BiONO3·H2O. 
 
Some compounds have been fully characterised with single crystal studies and found to contain the octahedral [Bi6Ox(OH)8−x](10−x)+ cation. The ion  is found in the perchlorate compound Bi6O4(OH)4ClO4·7H2O and is isoelectronic with the octahedral Sn6O4(OH)4 cluster found in the hydrate of tin(II) oxide, 3SnO·H2O. The compounds that contain this are:
Bi6O4(HO)4(NO3)6·H2O (equivalent to BiONO3·H2O; Bi2O3·N2O5·H2O )

Bi6O4(OH)4(NO3)6·4H2O (equivalent to BiONO3·H2O; Bi2O3·N2O5·6H2O )

[Bi6O4(OH)4][Bi6O5(OH)3](NO3)11, which contains two different cations, [Bi6O4(OH)4]6+ and [Bi6O5(OH)3]5+

The compound Bi6O5(OH)3(NO3)5·3H2O (equivalent to 6Bi2O3·5N2O5·9H2O) also contains the octahedral units but this time they are joined to form  {[Bi6O5(OH)3]5+}2.

Additionally some oxynitrates have layer structures (a common motif also found in bismuth(III) oxyhalides):

Bi2O2(OH)NO3 (equivalent to BiONO3·H2O) contains "[Bi2O2]2+" layers
Bi5O7NO3, which is isostructural with β-Bi5O7I

Cluster cation structure
The octahedral ion has 6 Bi3+ ions at the corners of an octahedron. There is no covalent bond between the Bi atoms, they are held in position by bridging O2− and OH− anions, one at the centre of each of the eight triangular faces, bridging three Bi ions. The Bi ions are essentially four coordinate and are at the apex of a flat square pyramid. An ab initio theoretical study of the hydration mechanism of Bi3+ and the structure concludes that the lone pairs on the Bi3+ ions are stereochemically active.

Preparation 
Bismuth oxynitrates can be prepared from bismuth(III) nitrate. For example, hydrolysis of a solution of bismuth nitrate through the addition of alkali or the reaction of the pentahydrate, BiNO3·5H2O with KOH, or the controlled thermal decomposition of the pentahydrate.

The thermal decomposition of bismuth nitrate pentahydrate proceeds through the following stages:
At pH below 1.0, Bi6O4(OH)4(NO3)6·4H2O (equivalent to BiNO3·H2O) is the first solid product, which when heated produces  Bi6H2O(NO3)O4(OH)4 (equivalent to BiNO3.H2O).
Between pH 1.2 and 1.8, further hydrolysis occurs and  Bi6O5(OH)3(NO3)5·3H2O is formed. 
The final oxynitrate product of thermal dehydration is believed to be Bi5O7NO3, which is isostructural with β–Bi5O7I and has a layer structure. The ultimate  stage of thermal decomposition of oxynitrates is bismuth(III) oxide, Bi2O3.

References

Bismuth compounds